T & G Mutual Life Assurance Building is a heritage-listed office building at 45 Hunter Street, Newcastle, City of Newcastle, New South Wales, Australia. It was added to the New South Wales State Heritage Register on 2 April 1999.

History 

The building was built in 1923 for McIlwraith McEacharn Line Pty Ltd and named Scottish House. It was designed by Spain and Cosh and built by contractors Stuart Brothers. The cost of the building and land amounted to approximately £100,000.

In 1935, it was bought by the T & G Mutual Life Assurance Society for approximately £90,000, in what was then the biggest sale of any single freehold property in Newcastle.

In the early 1990s, the building was known as Hunter House.

Description

The T & G Building is a seven-storey rendered brick building in the English Renaissance style with a corner tower. It originally consisted of five storeys with a basement, with an additional two floors added after the building was bought by T & G.

Heritage listing 
T & G Mutual Life Assurance Building was listed on the New South Wales State Heritage Register on 2 April 1999.

See also

References

Attribution

External links

New South Wales State Heritage Register
Newcastle, New South Wales
Office buildings in New South Wales
Articles incorporating text from the New South Wales State Heritage Register